Glamour for Sale is a 1940 American crime film directed by D. Ross Lederman and starring Anita Louise, Roger Pryor, and Frances Robinson.

Plot
A poor girl, working for an escort agency, is given for her first client a man working for the police, who suspect the business is involved in blackmail. Her innocence of the agency's criminal activities, along with her looks, charm, and wit mean that only she among all the club's girls can help the police break one of the city's many criminal rackets.

Cast
 Anita Louise as Ann Powell 
 Roger Pryor as Jim Daly 
 Frances Robinson as Betty Warren 
 June MacCloy as Peggy Davis 
 Don Beddoe as Frank Regan 
 Paul Fix as Louis Manell 
 Arthur Loft as Harry T. Braddock 
 Veda Ann Borg as Lucille
Minta Durfee as Matron (uncredited)

References

Bibliography
 McCarty, Clifford. Film Composers in America: A Filmography, 1911-1970. Oxford University Press, 2000.

External links

Glamour for Sale at Turner Classic Movies

1940 films
American crime films
1940 crime films
1940s English-language films
Columbia Pictures films
Films directed by D. Ross Lederman
American black-and-white films
1940s American films